Noel McGrath (born 17 December 1990) is an Irish hurler who plays for Tipperary Senior Championship club Loughmore-Castleiney and at inter-county level with the Tipperary senior hurling team. He usually lines out as at midfield.

Playing career

Our Lady's Secondary School

McGrath first came to prominence as a hurler with Our Lady's Secondary School in Templemore. On 6 December 2006, he scored 1-03 from midfield when Our Lady's Secondary School defeated De La Salle by 1-10 to 2-04 to win the Dean Ryan Cup.

University College Dublin

During his studies at University College Dublin, McGrath joined the university's senior hurling team in his second year. He lined out in several Fitzgibbon Cup campaigns and served as team captain for two years.

Loughmore–Castleiney

McGrath joined the Loughmore–Castleiney club at a young age and played in all grades at juvenile and underage levels, enjoying championship success in the under-21 grade. He joined the club's senior teams as a dual player in 2007.

On 21 October 2007, McGrath was just 16-years-old when he lined out at left wing-forward in the Tipperary Hurling Championship final. He scored six points, including three frees, and collected a winners' medal following the 0-22 to 0-13 defeat of Drom–Inch. McGrath retained his position at left wing-forward for the Munster final against Tulla on 2 December 2012. He ended the game with a winners' medal following the 1-06 to 0-07 victory.

On 7 November 2010, McGrath lined out at left wing-forward when Loughmore–Castleiney faced Aherlow in the Tipperary Football Championship final. He was held scoreless throughout and ended the game on the losing side after a 2-04 to 1-06 defeat.

On 13 October 2013, McGrath lined out at midfield against Nenagh Éire Óg in the Tipperary Hurling Championship final. He ended the game with a second winners' medal following the 1-17 to 1-16 victory. On 3 November 2013, McGrath lined out in his second final of the year when Loughmore–Castleiney faced Aherlow in the Tipperary Football Championship final. He ended the game with a second winners' medal as Loughmore–Castleiney completed an historic double following a 3-10 to 0-09 victory.

McGrath lined out in a second successive Tipperary Hurling Championship final on 2 November 2014. He top scored with five points from left wing-forward in the 2-22 to 3-11 defeat by Thurles Sarsfields. McGrath lined out in a second successive Tipperary Football Championship final on 21 December 2014. He lined out at midfield in the 2-07 to 1-10 draw with Cahir. McGrath retained his position at midfield for the replay on 26 December 2014 and collected a second successive winners' medal following a 0-09 to 2-02 victory.

McGrath lined out in a third Tipperary Football Championship final in four seasons on 30 October 2016. He scored two points from midfield and ended the game with a third winners' medal following a 1-09 to 1-06 defeat of Moyle Rovers.

McGrath completed his second Tipperary double as Loughmore–Castleiney won the Tipperary Senior Football Championship against Clonmel Commercials on 21 November 2021, and then a week later won the Hurling Championship against Thurles Sarsfields. McGrath captained the team against Thurles Sarsfields.

Tipperary

Minor & under-21

McGrath first played for Tipperary as a 15-year-old when he joined the minor team during the 2006 Munster Championship. He made his first appearance for the team on 3 May 2006 when he came on as a substitute for Gearóid Ryan in a 2-23 to 3-08 defeat of Limerick. McGrath was again selected on the bench for the Munster final. He was introduced as a substitute for Séamus Hennessy in the 2-20 to 1-15 defeat by Cork. On 3 September 2006, McGrath broke onto the starting fifteen and was named at midfield when Tipperary faced Galway in the All-Ireland final. He ended the game with a winners' medal following the 2-18 to 2-07 victory.

On 8 July 2007, McGrath scored a point from midfield when Tipperary won the Munster Championship following an 0-18 to 1-11 defeat of Cork in the final. On 2 September 2007, he was again selected at midfield for the All-Ireland final against Cork. He scored a point from play and claimed a second successive winners' medal following the 3-14 to 2-11 victory.

McGrath was again eligible for the minor grade for a third and final season in 2008. On 13 July 2008, he scored five points from play when Tipperary suffered a 0-19 to 0-18 defeat by Cork in the Munster final.

McGrath was drafted onto the Tippearry under-21 prior to the start of the 2009 Munster Championship. He made his first appearance for the team on 3 June 2009 when he scored a point in a 2-22 to 0-25 defeat of Cork.

On 28 July 2010, McGrath won a Munster Championship medal after lining out at midfield in Tipperary's 1-22 to 1-17 defeat of Clare in the final. He retained his position at midfield for the All-Ireland final against Galway on 11 September 2010. McGrath ended the game with an All-Ireland medal following the 5-22 to 0-12 victory.

McGrath was appointed captain of the Tipperary under-21 team for the 2011 Munster Championship. He played his last game in the grade on 15 July 2011 when he captained Tipperary to a 4-19 to 1-21 defeat by Cork.

Senior

McGrath joined the Tipperary senior team in advance of the 2009 National League. He made his first appearance for the team on 14 February 2009 when he came on as a substitute for James Woodlock in a 2-15 to 0-09 defeat of Cork. On 3 May 2009, McGrath scored 1-05 from right corner-forward in Tipperary's 2-26 to 4-17 extra-time defeat by Kilkenny in the National League final. On 31 May 2009, he made his Munster Championship debut when he scored three points from right wing-forward in a 1-19 to 0-19 defeat of Cork. On 12 July 2009, McGrath started the Munster final at right corner-forward and ended the game with a winners' medal after scoring three points in the 4-14 to 2-16 defeat of Waterford. He was again selected at right corner-forward for the All-Ireland final against Kilkenny on 6 September 2009. McGrath scored two points from play but ended the game on the losing side following a 2-22 to 0-23 defeat. He ended his debut season by being named at right corner-forward on the All-Star team while he was also named Young Hurler of the Year.

On 5 September 2010, McGrath was selected at right corner-forward when Tipperary qualified to play Kilkenny in a second successive All-Ireland final. He was one of two goal-scorers for Tipperary and collected his first All-Ireland medal following a 4-17 to 1-18 victory. McGrath ended the season by winning a second All-Star award.

On 10 July 2011, McGrath won a second Munster Championship medal after scoring two points from right wing-forward in a 7-19 to 0-19 defeat of Waterford in the Munster final. On 4 September 2011, he was selected at centre-forward when Tipperary faced Kilkenny in a third successive All-Ireland final. McGrath scored three points from play but ended the game on the losing side following a 2-17 to 1-16 defeat.

On 15 July 2012, McGrath lined out at left corner-forward when Tipperary qualified to play Waterford in a second successive Munster final. He ended the game with a third winners' medal in four seasons after scoring three points in the 2-17 to 0-16 victory. 

On 5 May 2013, McGrath was selected at right wing-forward when Tipperary faced Kilkenny in the National League final. He scored three points from play but ended on the losing side following a 2-17 to 0-20 defeat.

McGrath lined out at right corner-forward in a second successive National League final against Kilkenny on 4 May 2014. He scored five points from play but ended the game on the losing side following a 2-25 to 1-27 defeat. On 7 September 2014, McGrath scored four points from right corner-forward in a 1-28 to 3-22 draw with Kilkenny in the All-Ireland final. He was switched to centre-forward for the replay on 27 September 2014, however, he ended the game on the losing side after a 2-17 to 2-14 defeat.

On 15 April 2015, it was revealed that McGrath was to undergo surgery for testicular cancer two days later. He later said: "I knew for two or three weeks that there wasn't something fully right. You're just hoping that you got hit in training or maybe you got a belt but the longer it was there, I knew something wasn't right. Thankfully I got looked after very well." McGrath returned to the Tipperary training panel in June 2015. On 16 August 2015, he received a standing ovation when he came on as a substitute in Tipperary's 0-26 to 3-16 defeat by Galway in the All-Ireland semi-final. McGrath was named as the 2015 Tipperary Person of the Year by the Tipperary Association Dublin.

McGrath claimed a fourth Munster Championship medal on 10 July 2016 after scoring a point from left wing-forward in a 5-19 to 0-13 defeat of Waterford in the final. On 5 September 2016, he retained his position at left wing-forward for the All-Ireland final against Kilkenny. McGrath scored a point from play and collected a second All-Ireland medal following a 2-29 to 2-20 victory. 

On 23 April 2017, McGrath lined out in his fourth National League final. He scored two points from right corner-forward but ended the game on the losing side following a 3-21 to 0-14 victory for Galway.

On 30 June 2019, McGrath scored a point from midfield when Tipperary suffered a 2-26 to 2-14 defeat by Limerick in the Munster final. On 18 August 2019, he was selected at midfield when Tipperary faced Kilkenny in the All-Ireland final. McGrath scored two points from play and ended the game with a third All-Ireland winners' medal following the 3-25 to 0-20 victory. He ended the season by receiving his third All-Star award.

In November 2022, McGrath was named as the new Tipperary captain for the 2023 season.

Munster

McGrath was added to the Munster team in advance of the 2012 Railway Cup. He made his first appearance for the team on 9 February 2014 when he scored two points from centre-forward in a 1-18 to 0-16 defeat by Connacht.

On 15 December 2016, McGrath was selected on the bench when Munster faced Leinster in the Railway Cup final. He was introduced as a half-time substitute for Shane Bennett and claimed a Railway Cup medal following the 2-20 to 2-16 victory.

Personal life

McGrath is the son of Pat McGrath who won an All-Ireland medal with Tipperary in 1989. His brother, John, is also an All-Ireland medal winner, and a current teammate on the Tipperary senior team, while his youngest brother, Brian, has also lined out with the Tipperary senior team.

Career statistics

Club

Hurling

Football

Inter-county

Honours

Loughmore–Castleiney
 Munster Senior Club Hurling Championship (1): 2007
 Tipperary Senior Hurling Championship (3): 2007, 2013, 2021 (c)
 Tipperary Senior Football Championship (4): 2013, 2014, 2016, 2021
Mid Tipperary Senior Hurling Championship (3): 2011, 2016, 2018
Mid Tipperary Senior Football Championship (9): 2007, 2008, 2009, 2010, 2012, 2015, 2016, 2017, 2018

Tipperary
 All-Ireland Senior Hurling Championship (3): 2010, 2016, 2019
 Munster Senior Hurling Championship (4): 2009, 2011, 2012, 2016
 Waterford Crystal Cup (2): 2012, 2014
All-Ireland Under-21 Hurling Championship (1): 2010
Munster Under-21 Hurling Championship (2): 2008, 2010
All-Ireland Minor Hurling Championship (2): 2006, 2007 
Munster Minor Hurling Championship (1): 2007

Munster
Railway Cup (1): 2016

Individual
All Stars Young Hurler of the Year (1): 2009
GAA GPA All Stars Awards (3): 2009, 2010, 2019
GAA/GPA Player of the Month (2): August 2010, August 2019
All-Ireland Senior Hurling Championship Final Man of the Match (1): 2019
The Sunday Game Team of the Year (1): 2019
The Sunday Game Hurler of the Year (1): 2019

References

1990 births
Living people
Dual players
Loughmore-Castleiney hurlers
Loughmore-Castleiney Gaelic footballers
UCD hurlers
Tipperary inter-county hurlers
All-Ireland Senior Hurling Championship winners